Melissa Coleman (born 1969) is an American author, columnist, and writer best known as the author of This Life Is in Your Hands, a childhood memoir exploring her iconic family's search for a sustainable lifestyle.

Coleman was born in Brooksville, Maine to parents Sue and Eliot Coleman of the Back-to-the-land movement of the 60s and 70s, and her parents have been referred to as disciples of Scott and Helen Nearing. Coleman is a columnist for Maine and Maine Home and Design magazines, and serves on the board of the Telling Room, a Portland, Maine writing center for kids. Melissa lives in Freeport, Maine, with her twin daughters.

Bibliography
Non-fiction
This Life Is in Your Hands: One Dream, Sixty Acres, and a Family Undone (2011)

References

External links 
 Official Site
 Official Blog
 (Official publisher web page)

1969 births
Living people
American memoirists
American columnists
American women columnists
American non-fiction environmental writers
People from Brooksville, Maine
People from Freeport, Maine
American women memoirists